The 1969 Philippine presidential and vice presidential elections were held on November 11, 1969. Incumbent President Ferdinand Marcos won a second full term as President of the Philippines. Marcos was the last president in the entire electoral history of the Philippines who ran for and won a second term. His running mate, incumbent Vice President Fernando Lopez, was also elected to a third full term as Vice President of the Philippines. A total of twelve candidates ran for president, but ten of those got less than 0.01% of the vote.

Constitutionally barred for a third term, Marcos sought to amend the constitution to allow him to do so. A constitutional convention was elected in 1970 for this purpose. Growing unrest led to Marcos declaring martial law in 1972. Months later, the constitutional convention passed a new constitution, which was subsequently ratified in a plebiscite in 1973. Marcos then ruled by decree, and a presidential election would not be held again until 1981. The office of the vice president was abolished in the new constitution but was reinstated in 1984, and an election for it was first held in 1986.

Results

For president

For vice-president

Aftermath 
Marcos, who was term-limited in the upcoming 1973 election, proposed drafting a new constitution. An election in 1970 elected delegates to the constitutional convention. Due to rising unrest, Marcos declared martial law and suspended the current (1935) constitution in 1972. The constitutional convention, which by then had seen its delegates opposed to Marcos dictatorship arrested or fled the country, then passed its draft constitution, and a plebiscite in January 1973 approved the constitution. A petition declaring that the 1973 constitution as unlawfully enacted was dismissed by the Supreme Court. Further plebiscites in July 1973 and 1977 extended Marcos's term, and a presidential election won't be held again until 1981.

See also
Commission on Elections
Politics of the Philippines
Philippine elections
President of the Philippines
7th Congress of the Philippines
Ferdinand Marcos presidential campaign, 1969

External links
 The Philippine Presidency Project
 Official website of the Commission on Elections
 Ferdinand Marcos on the Presidential Museum and Library

1969
1969 elections in the Philippines